Anna-Leena Härkönen (born 10 April 1965) is a Finnish writer and actress.

She was born in Liminka and studied acting at the college of drama and the University of Tampere's program of drama studies, which she concluded in 1989. She won the J. H. Erkko Award in 1984 for her debut novel How to Kill a Bull.

Currently Anna-Leena Härkönen lives in Helsinki and works as freelance writer; novelist and actress.

A few dramatic productions, including one movie, have been adapted from Härkönen's works. Häräntappoase was made into a six-part television series and stage productions in Turku and Kotka and summer 2010 in Pyynikin kesäteatteri in Tampere. Scriptwriter Tove Idström and director Claes Olsson made a full-length movie based on Akvaariorakkautta ("Aquarium Love") which was released internationally as an art-house movie.

References

External links

Author bio at publisher's site (in Finnish)
Anna-Leena Härkönen at Internet Movie Database (IMDb.com)

1965 births
Living people
People from Liminka
Finnish actresses
20th-century Finnish novelists
Finnish dramatists and playwrights
Finnish screenwriters
Finnish television writers
Finnish women novelists
Writers from Northern Ostrobothnia
20th-century Finnish women writers
Finnish women dramatists and playwrights
21st-century Finnish novelists
21st-century Finnish women writers
Women television writers
Finnish women screenwriters
Thanks for the Book Award winners